"Fashionably Late" is the second single from American rock band Falling in Reverse's second album, Fashionably Late.

Background
"Fashionably Late", was released on May 21, 2013. The lyric video of the song had more than 200,000 views after the first day of release on YouTube.

The single "Fashionably Late" was in second place as the most viral song in world between May 20 to May 26. The single was also in the position 46 of the Billboard Rock Songs.

Critical reception
Under the Gun said "Like most of the group’s catalog the song offers numerous tongue-in-cheek lyrics thrown together against a melody that’s too catchy for its own good. It’s the kind of well-structured song that gets stuck in your mind". Metalholic: "'Fashionably Late' is at the opposite end of the spectrum compared to 'Alone'. Where 'Alone' has rapping and is intense and angry 'Fashionably Late' is upbeat, completely easy-going and has a more pop rock vibe to it".

Personnel
 Ronnie Radke – lead vocals
 Jacky Vincent – lead guitar
 Derek Jones – rhythm guitar, backing vocals
 Ryan Seaman – drums, percussion, backing vocals
 Ron Ficarro – bass, backing vocals

Charts

References

2013 songs
Falling in Reverse songs
2013 singles
Epitaph Records singles
Songs written by Ronnie Radke